Leslie Charles "Les" Nimmo (23 February 1897 – 6 November 1972) was an Australian politician who was a Liberal Party member of the Legislative Assembly of Western Australia from 1947 to 1956 and again from 1959 to 1968.

Nimmo was born in Hobart, Tasmania, to Frances (née Grahame) and James Nimmo. He served with the Royal Australian Navy during World War I, and on his return to Hobart worked as a shop assistant. Nimmo moved to Perth in 1930, and began working for a department store, where he eventually became a manager. He entered parliament at the 1947 state election, narrowly winning the inner-city seat of Mount Hawthorn from the Labor Party. At the 1950 election, Nimmo transferred to the new seat of Wembley Beaches, with his old seat reverting to the Labor Party. He again attempted to move seats at the 1956 election, but was defeated in the seat of Leederville by the sitting member, Labor's Ted Johnson. A Labor candidate, Frederick Marshall, also won in Wembley Beaches, but Nimmo reclaimed that seat at the 1959 election. However, Wembley Beaches was abolished prior to the 1962 election, forcing another change of seats to the new Karrinyup electorate. Nimmo held Karrinyup until his retirement at the 1968 election. He died in Perth in November 1972, aged 75. He was married twice, having two children by his first wife and then remarrying at the age of 67 following her death.

References

1897 births
1972 deaths
Liberal Party of Australia members of the Parliament of Western Australia
Members of the Western Australian Legislative Assembly
Politicians from Hobart